George Brown was a former Australian professional soccer player who played as a forward for Brisbane City, Pineapple Rovers and the Australia national soccer team.

Club career
Brown played for many years for Brisbane City in the Queensland FA Division One. In 1925, he moved to Pineapple Rovers. He won the Premiership in his first season in 1925 with the Pineapple Rovers.

International career
Brown began his international career with Australia in 1922 on their first historic tour against New Zealand, debuting in a 1–1 draw to New Zealand. He scored his first and only goal for Australia against New Zealand in a 1–3 defeat in July 1922.

Career statistics

International

Scores and results list Australia's goal tally first, score column indicates score after each Australia goal.

References

Australian soccer players
Association football forwards
Australia international soccer players